Mopang may refer to:
, a Design 1023 ship mined and sunk in 1921
Lake Mopang in Maine (see List of lakes in Maine)
Mopang Stream, a tributary of Machias River in Maine.